Ellen Braumüller (December 24, 1910, Berlin – August 10, 1991) was a track and field athlete from Germany, who competed mainly in the javelin throw. She competed for her native country at the 1932 Summer Olympics in Los Angeles, United States, where she won the silver medal in the javelin throw. At the 1932 Olympics, she also competed in the relay, discus and high jump. Born in Berlin, she was the younger sister of Inge Braumüller.

References

1910 births
1991 deaths
German female javelin throwers
German female high jumpers
German female discus throwers
German female sprinters
Olympic silver medalists for Germany
Athletes from Berlin
Olympic athletes of Germany
Athletes (track and field) at the 1932 Summer Olympics
Medalists at the 1932 Summer Olympics
Olympic silver medalists in athletics (track and field)
Women's World Games medalists